The Ton class were coastal minesweepers built in the 1950s for the Royal Navy, but also used by other navies such as the South African Navy and the Royal Australian Navy. They were intended to meet the threat of seabed mines laid in shallow coastal waters, rivers, ports and harbours, a task for which the existing ocean-going minesweepers of the Algerine-class were not suited.

Description
The design of the class drew on lessons learnt in the Second World War when it became apparent that minelaying in coastal waters was more effective than in the deep sea; the existing fleet minesweepers were not well suited to deal with this threat. Design started at the Naval Construction Department in Bath in 1947 and the first ship was ordered in September 1950; the class eventually numbered 119 vessels. The lead constructor was John I. Thornycroft & Company, although Ton-class vessels were also built at fifteen other yards. They were diesel powered vessels of 440 tons displacement fully laden, largely constructed from aluminium and other non-ferromagnetic materials, with a hull composed of a double layer of mahogany planking. Their small displacement and shallow draft gave them some protection against pressure and contact mines and allowed them to navigate in shallow inshore waters. Primary armament was one Bofors 40 mm gun, although the South African variants also had an Oerlikon 20 mm cannon behind the funnel. RN vessels also had the same but they were gradually removed and an M2 Browning machine gun mounted midships.  Sweeping equipment was provided for moored mines and magnetic mines.

It was originally planned to name the ships after insects, with names like Red Ant, Green Cockchafer and so on, but this plan was abandoned in 1952 and the Royal Navy ships of the class were given names of British towns and villages ending in "-ton", hence the name of the class. The contemporary but smaller inshore minesweepers were originally to be named after birds, but became the Ham-class, after towns and villages ending in "-ham".

Sixteen of the class were converted to minehunters by the incorporation of active rudders and the installation of the Type 193 minehunting sonar and associated equipment, including a very welcome enclosed bridge (the exception being HMS Highburton which retained her open bridge until decommissioning in the 1970s, this actually becoming a source of manliness to her crew when meeting other Ton crews). These vessels only retained mechanical "Oropesa" sweep capability.

The Ton-class served as patrol vessels in Borneo, Malaysia, Northern Ireland and Hong Kong. The minehunters played a significant role in the Suez Canal clearance after the Yom Kippur war. They also provided the backbone of the UK's Fishery Protection Squadron (4th MCM).

With the rundown of the Royal Navy fleet in the 1960s, many were sent to become base ships for the Royal Naval Reserve allowing reserve crews to get to sea for short periods without a lot of effort to organise a crew of significant size. Some of these had their names changed to reflect the RNR Division they were attached to. Five of the class in Royal Navy service were permanently converted to patrol craft for service policing of Hong Kong's territorial waters in 1971. These vessels, comprising HM Ships Beachampton, Monkton, Wasperton, Wolverton and Yarnton had their minesweeping gear removed and were fitted with a second Bofors 40 mm gun aft of the funnel. They also received new pennant numbers: Beachampton P1007, Monkton P1055, Wasperton P1089, Wolverton P1093 and Yarnton P1096. Two vessels were converted into survey ships, one an air sea rescue vessel and one a diving tender.

At the start of the Falklands War in 1982, the elderly Ton-class vessels were deemed to be unsuited to the long voyage to the South Atlantic, so five deep-sea trawlers were hired and hastily converted into minesweepers, although the crews were largely taken from the Ton-class mine countermeasures flotilla based at Rosyth.

The RNR vessels lasted until the introduction of the River-class minesweepers in 1984. The remainder of the regular RN ships began to be retired with the introduction of the Hunt-class MCM vessels from 1980. The last RN Ton-class ship to be withdrawn was also the last to have been built; HMS Wilton (M1116) had been built in 1971 - 1972 with a hull made of glass reinforced plastic (GRP) instead of wood. She was the first major warship in the world using this technology, which was used for all of the succeeding Hunt-class ships. Decommissioned in 1994, Wilton became a floating clubhouse for the Essex Yacht Club at Leigh-on-Sea.

Ships

Royal Navy 
The Royal Navy of the United Kingdom received 115 Ton-class minesweepers during the 1950s.  Several were later sold or transferred to other countries.

Argentine Navy

Royal Australian Navy 

The Royal Australian Navy bought six ex-Royal Navy minesweepers of the Ton class in 1961, and all were in service by 1962.  Individual ships were decommissioned over the years until the final ship in service, Curlew, was decommissioned and repurposed as a civilian fishing vessel.  Curlew had been updated as a mine hunter in 1967-1968 while the same treatment was given to Snipe in 1969–1970.

Ghana

India

Ireland

Royal Malaysian Navy

Royal New Zealand Navy

South African Navy

See also
 List of decommissioned ships of the South African Navy
 Ton-class minesweepers of the Royal Australian Navy

References

Further reading

External links
 TON Class Association

Mine warfare vessel classes
Napier Deltic
Ship classes of the Royal Navy